This is a list of notable students, professors, alumni and honorary degree recipients of Arellano University. The following Arellanites were distinguished in various fields including public service, religion, literary arts, commerce, and medicine. The list includes people who have studied at various levels in the university, from elementary up to postgraduate school.

Alumni

Arts and humanities

Law and politics

Athletics

1. People who attended Arellano, but did not graduate or have yet to graduate.

References

External links 
 Arellano University - official website

Arellano University